Financial independence is the status of having enough income or wealth sufficient to pay one's living expenses for the rest of one's life without having to be employed or dependent on others. Income earned without having to work a job is commonly referred to as passive income. Others define financial independence differently according to their own goals.

There are many strategies to achieve financial independence, each with their own benefits and drawbacks. Someone who wishes to achieve financial independence can find it helpful to have a financial plan and budget, so that they have a clear view of their current incomes and expenses, and can identify and choose appropriate strategies to move towards their financial goals. A financial plan addresses every aspect of a person's finances.

Passive sources of income to achieve financial independence

The following is a non-exhaustive list of sources of passive income that potentially yield financial independence.

 Bank fixed deposits and monthly income schemes
Business ownership (if the business does not require active operation)
Dividends from stocks, bonds and income trusts
 Interest earned from deposit accounts, money market accounts or loans
 Life annuity
Notes, including stocks and bonds
 Oil leases
Patent licensing
Pensions
Rental property
Royalty from creative works, e.g. photographs, books, patents, music, etc.
Trust deed (real estate)

Approaches to financial independence
If a person can generate enough income to meet their needs from sources other than their primary occupation, they have achieved financial independence, regardless of age, existing wealth, or current salary. For example, if a 25-year-old has $1000 in expenses per month, and assets that generate $1000 or more per month, they have achieved financial independence. They have no need to work a regular job to pay their bills.

On the other hand, if a 50-year-old has assets that generate $1,000,000 a month but has expenses that equal more than that per month, they are not financially independent, as they still have to earn the difference each month to make all their payments.

However, the effects of inflation must be considered. If a person needs $100/month for living expenses today, they will need $105/month next year and $110.25/month the following year to support the same lifestyle, assuming a 5% annual inflation rate. Therefore, if the person in the above example obtains their passive income from a perpetuity, there will be a time when they lose their financial independence because of inflation.

If someone receives $5000 in dividends from stocks they own, but their expenses total $4000, they can live on their dividend income because it pays for all their expenses to live (with some left over). Under these circumstances, a person is financially independent. A person's assets and liabilities are an important factor in determining if they have achieved financial independence. An asset is anything of value that can be readily turned into cash (liquidated) if a person has to pay debt, whereas a liability is a responsibility to provide compensation. (Homes and automobiles with no loans or mortgages are common assets.)

Since there are two sides to the assets and expenses equation, there are two main directions one can focus their energy: accumulating assets or reducing their expenses.

Asset accumulation
Accumulating assets can focus one or both of these approaches:

 Gather revenue-generating assets until the generated revenue surpasses living/liability expenses.
 Gather enough liquid assets to then sustain all future living/liability expenses.

Expense reduction
Another approach to financial independence is to reduce regular expenses while accumulating assets, to reduce the amount of assets required for financial independence.  This can be done by focusing on simple living, or other strategies to reduce expenses.

See also

FIRE movement

References

Further reading
Vicki Robin and Joe Dominguez (1992) Your Money or Your Life, Viking. Your Money or Your Life: Revised and Updated for the 21st Century, published by Penguin Books in December 2008 by Vicki Robin with Monique Tilford and contributor Mark Zaifman.
Jacob Lund Fisker (2010) Early Retirement Extreme: A philosophical and practical guide to financial independence, 
Kristy Shen and Bryce Leung (2019) Quit Like a Millionaire, published by Penguin Random House, 

Personal finance
Retirement
Wealth